Colorful Sensibility is the second studio album by South Korean band F.T. Island, released on 25 August 2008. The album sold 11,209 copies in one month.

Track list

References

Further reading

2008 albums
Pop rock albums by South Korean artists
FNC Entertainment albums
F.T. Island albums
Korean-language albums